Bijbania is a village in West Champaran district in the Indian state of Bihar.

Demographics
As of 2011 India census, Bijbania had a population of 407 in 86 households. Males constitute 53.8% of the population and female 46.1%. Bijbania has an average literacy rate of 49.14%, lower than the national average of 74%: male literacy is 71.5%, and female literacy is 28.4%. In Bijbania, 16.21% of the population is under 6 years of age.

References

Villages in West Champaran district